This is a list of the most notable Yugoslav cinema films.

1940s

1950s

1960s

1970s

1980s

1990s

See also
 List of Yugoslav submissions for the Academy Award for Best International Feature Film
 List of films from Serbia and Montenegro
 List of Bosnia and Herzegovina films
 List of Croatian films
 List of Kosovan films
 List of Montenegrin films
 List of films from North Macedonia
 List of Serbian films
 List of Slovenian films

External links
 Yugoslav film at the Internet Movie Database